Take My Wife is an American sitcom on the Seeso comedy subscription streaming service. The show follows former real-life couple Cameron Esposito and River Butcher (credited as Rhea Butcher) as they share their lives as stand-up comics who are balancing work, relationships, and the breaking down of gender barriers. On December 19, 2016, Seeso renewed the series for a second season. On August 9, 2017, Seeso announced the shutdown of its service by the end of the year, leaving Take My Wife without a home. On March 5, 2018, it was announced that season 1 and the previously unaired season 2 were now available on iTunes (US) and would be available on the Starz app starting May 1, 2018. Take My Wife is also now available on iTunes in the UK (as of April 30, 2018).

For its second season, the show's creators and producers featured large numbers of women, people of color, and LGBTQ individuals in front of and behind the camera. Esposito has acknowledged this was a conscious effort on their part: "As a small budget show, we prioritized hiring queer folks, POC, and female standups."

Cast

Main
 Cameron Esposito as self
 River Butcher (credited as Rhea Butcher) as self
 Zeke Nicholson as Dave
 Laura Kightlinger as Frances

Guest stars

 Eliza Skinner as Eliza
 Jonah Ray as Podcast Host
 Alice Wetterlund as Alice
 Gabe Dunn as Brie 
 Janet Varney as Melina Marquez
 Matt Braunger as Bob Herzog
 Maria Bamford as herself
 Kulap Vilaysack as Danielle
 Joe DeRosa as Kent
 Sam Jay as Sam Jay
 Tawny Newsome as Pam
 Chris Farah as Pam
 James Adomian as Tony
 Mary Grill as Firefighter
 Kurt Braunohler as Daniel
 Mary Lynn Rajskub as herself
 Tess Paras as Miranda
 Marcella Arguello as Waitress
 Ahmed Bharoocha as Jimmy the delivery guy
 Paul F. Tompkins as himself
 Daniel Lee as Dean Smith's receptionist
 Ele Woods as Tatiana
 Seth Morris as Guitar owner
 Ron Funches as Himself
 Brittani Nichols as Bethani
 Irene Tu as Jamie
 Riley Silverman as Regan
 Clea DuVall as an audience member
 Tegan and Sara as wedding guests

2017 campaign to save Take My Wife
On August 9, 2017 it was announced that NBC would be shutting down Seeso. A web campaign to "#SaveTakeMyWife" quickly formed to encourage another network or streaming service to pick up the show for future seasons. On March 5, 2018, it was announced that the distribution rights to the first two seasons had been picked up for the Starz app and that both seasons were now available on iTunes.

Episodes

Season 1 (2016)

Season 2 (2018)

References

External links

2010s American LGBT-related comedy television series
2016 American television series debuts
2018 American television series endings
English-language television shows
Lesbian-related television shows
Seeso original programming